The Malabar Leaffish (Pristolepis marginata) is a species of freshwater fish in the family Pristolepididae. It lives in the Western Ghats in India.

References

Pristolepididae
Fish described in 1849